Willow Creek in Madera County, California, is one of the largest rivers in Madera County, and is the primary inflow for Bass Lake. Willow Creek features a series of cascades called Angel Falls.

Willow Creek begins its journey off the slopes of Iron Mountain, at an elevation close to 9000 feet.

References

Rivers of Madera County, California